Carlos Iglesias Serrano (born 15 July 1955) is a Spanish actor and filmmaker. From 1998 to 2001, he starred as Benito in the comedy television series Manos a la obra, extremely popular for Spanish audiences throughout its broadcasting run.

Biography 

Carlos Iglesias Serrano was born on 15 July 1955 in Madrid, living for a time with his family in Quintanar de la Orden. From 1960 to 1966, he lived in Switzerland, where his parents had immigrated. After returning to Spain, and living in Alicante and Madrid, he graduated from the RESAD.

He earned early public recognition in the 1990s for his appearances as 'Pepelu' in the late-night show .

He earned further recognition for his performance in Antena 3 comedy television series Manos a la obra (1998–2001), a massive audience hit that broke the 6 million viewers per episode mark, starring in a tandem alongside Ángel de Andrés, respectively portraying Benito Lopera and Manolo Jumilla, two clumsy and lazy bricklayers. The broadcasting run from 1998 to 2001 comprised 6 seasons and about 130 episodes.

Iglesias starred as Sancho Panza in Manuel Gutiérrez Aragón's 2002 film Don Quixote, Knight Errant, earning a nomination to the Goya Award for Best New Actor for his performance.

Iglesias made his feature film directorial debut with the 2006 immigration comedy-drama Crossing the Border, in which he also starred and took over writing duties. His second feature was Inspansi (¡Españoles!), whose plot also related to the Spanish diaspora. He also directed the sequel to Crossing the Border, 2 Francos, 40 pesetas, released in 2014.

Film director 
 2006: Un Franco, 14 pesetas (Crossing the Border)
 2011: 
 2014: 
 2020: La suite nupcial

Accolades

References 

1955 births
Living people
20th-century Spanish male actors
Spanish male television actors
Spanish male film actors
Spanish film directors
Spanish screenwriters